The Viramgam–Maliya Miyana section belongs to Western Railway's Ahmedabad Division.

History
Viramgam–Maliya Miyana section was opened in the early 1940s. A small line from Jhund to Kharagoda was laid by 1909.

Freight service
About five express trains pass through this line daily. This line is a dedicated freight corridor to Kandla Port and Mundra Port from the remaining parts of India. Later in October 2011, a goods train with 120 wagons plied on this section.

References

5 ft 6 in gauge railways in India
Railway lines in Gujarat
1942 establishments in India